Eudorellopsis is a genus of hooded shrimps within the family Leuconidae. There are currently 9 species assigned to the genus.

Species 

 Eudorellopsis biplicata 
 Eudorellopsis deformis 
 Eudorellopsis derzhavini 
 Eudorellopsis integra 
 Eudorellopsis leuconi 
 Eudorellopsis longirostris 
 Eudorellopsis mykteros 
 Eudorellopsis resima 
 Eudorellopsis uschakovi

References 

Cumacea
Malacostraca genera